Verelst is a surname. Notable people with the surname include:

Cornelis Verelst (1667–1734), Dutch painter
Harry Verelst (1734–1785), British diplomat
Harry Verelst (1846–1918), English cricketer
Herman Verelst (1641–1690), Dutch Golden Age painter
John Verelst (1648–1734), Dutch Golden Age painter
Maria Verelst (1680–1744), English painter
Pieter Hermansz Verelst (1618–1688), Dutch Golden Age painter
Simon Pietersz Verelst (1644–1710), Dutch Golden Age painter
Steve Verelst (born 1987), Belgian footballer
William Verelst (1704–1752), English painter